Elections to the Madhya Pradesh Legislative Assembly were held in February 1967. These were the elections to the legislative assembly having 296 seats in undivided Madhya Pradesh. Govind Narayan Singh was elected to the assembly as an Indian National Congress candidate but soon rebelled against the incumbent Chief Minister, Dwarka Prasad Mishra and resigned from the Congress party. He formed a new political party, known as the Lok Sewak Dal and became the Chief Minister of Madhya Pradesh as the leader of a coalition, known as the Samyukta Vidhayak Dal.

After the previous election in 1962, the number of constituencies in Madhya Pradesh were increased from 288 to 296, following the recommendation of the Delimitation Commission of India.

Result 
Source:

Elected Members

References

1967
1967
Madhya Pradesh